Mario Più (born Mario Piperno on August 26, 1965 in Livorno, Italy) is an Italian professional disc jockey.

His 1999 single, "Communication", also known as "The Communication Song", is notable for being mainly constructed from the interference caused on improperly shielded audio equipment when a GSM mobile telephone rings nearby.

Discography

Singles

References

External links
 Mario Più’s official site

Italian dance musicians
Italian DJs
Living people
Place of birth missing (living people)
1965 births
Italian trance musicians
Incentive Records artists
Electronic dance music DJs